Stoney Creek is a  long second order tributary to the Delaware River in New Castle County, Delaware.

Variant names
According to the Geographic Names Information System, it has also been known historically as:
Fransens Creek
Oele Fransens Creek
Tukohtene Creek
Quarry Creek
Quarryville Creek
Stenkill Creek
Stony Creek

Course and dam
Stoney Creek rises on the Perkins Run divide in Westwoods in New Castle County, Delaware and flows southeast to mouth at the Delaware River just north of Fox Point State Park. It passes through in Bellevue State Park. Tukohtene Falls (Lenape for round mountain) is a ten-foot waterfall located in the park.

Bellevue Lake is a reservoir created by the impounding of Stoney Creek in 1936. it has a capacity of 100 millions gallons of water. Bellevue Lake is a remnant of the Old Bellevue Quarry, which was allowed to fill. The reservoir supplied the Wilmington and Suburban Water Comopany, which was founded in 1933 and has since absorbed into Suez Water.

Watershed
Stony Creek has a stream segment length of 1km. Located in the deciduous and mixed forests. It is one of four major streams that empty into the Delaware River from the Piedmont in Delaware, the others are Shellpot Creek, Perkins Run and Naamans Creek.

Images

See also
List of rivers of Delaware

References 

Rivers of New Castle County, Delaware
Tributaries of the Delaware River